Everett is an unincorporated community in Summit County, in the U.S. state of Ohio.

History
Early variant names were Unionville and Johnnycake, on account of the johnnycake canal passengers resorted to eating during a flood which stopped traffic. The present name Everett honors a railroad official. A post office called Everett was established in 1880, and remained in operation until 1953.

References

Unincorporated communities in Summit County, Ohio
Unincorporated communities in Ohio